Sangpang Bum is one of the highest mountains of the Northern Triangle of Burma. It is located in the Sagaing Region, Burma. 

With a height of 2,692 m and a prominence of 1,655 m, Sangpang Bum is one of the ultra prominent peaks of Southeast Asia.

See also
Northern Triangle temperate forest
List of mountains in Burma
List of Ultras of Southeast Asia

References

External links

Google Books, The Physical Geography of Southeast Asia

Sagaing Region
Mountains of Myanmar